Vikram Sudhir Deshpande, is an Indian-born British engineer and materials scientist, currently Professor of Materials Engineering in the Department of Engineering at the University of Cambridge.

Early life and education
Deshpande grew up in Dadar, Mumbai, studied at Bombay Scottish School in Mahim, and gained a B.Tech. from the Indian Institute of Technology in 1994. That year, he moved to Cambridge, UK to take an M.Phil. in engineering, initially working on transportation with David Cebon, and earning his Ph.D. in 1998.

Career
Later, he became interested in materials and mechanics, including small-scale materials, and began a long collaboration with Norman Fleck on micro-architectured materials. After further research in the United States, he returned to Cambridge, became a fellow of Pembroke College in 1999, a lecturer in engineering in 2001, and a professor in 2010. He has been a visiting professor at Brown University, University of California at Santa Barbara, University of Eindhoven in the Netherlands, and Università Campus Bio-Medico in Rome.

Achievements and awards

His achievements include the development of "metallic wood", which comprises nickel sheet with wood-like, nanoscale pores that make it as strong as titanium but four to five times lighter.

Deshpande has received multiple awards for his work, including the 2022 William Prager Medal, the 2021 Gili Agostinelli Prize, the 2020 Rodney Hill Prize in Solid Mechanics, the 2018 Sir William Hopkins Prize in Mathematical and Physical Sciences, and the 2003 Philip Leverhulme Prize. He was elected a Fellow of the Royal Society in 2020 in recognition of "significant contributions in fields ranging from the design of micro-architectured materials to modelling soft and active materials", "innovations [that] have helped define the modern frontiers of solid mechanics", and research that "has had a major impact in materials engineering".

Selected publications

References

External links
 

Living people
Year of birth missing (living people)
Alumni of Pembroke College, Cambridge
British engineers
Fellows of Pembroke College, Cambridge
Fellows of the Royal Society
Indian emigrants to the United Kingdom
Scientists from Mumbai
Scholars from Mumbai
IIT Bombay alumni
Engineering professors at the University of Cambridge